Rain is a 1932 pre-Code drama film that stars Joan Crawford as prostitute Sadie Thompson. Directed by Lewis Milestone and set in the South Seas, the production was filmed in part at Santa Catalina Island and what is now Crystal Cove State Park in California. The film also features Walter Huston in the role of a conflicted missionary who insists that Sadie end her evil ways, but whose own moral standards and self-righteous behavior steadily decay. Crawford was loaned out by MGM to United Artists for this film.

The plot of the film is based on the 1922 play Rain by John Colton and Clemence Randolph, which in turn was based on the 1921 short story "Miss Thompson" (later retitled "Rain") by W. Somerset Maugham. Actress Jeanne Eagels had played the role on stage.  Other movie versions of the story include: a 1928 silent film titled Sadie Thompson starring Gloria Swanson, and Miss Sadie Thompson (1953), which starred Rita Hayworth.

Plot

A westbound ship en route to Apia, Samoa, is temporarily stranded at nearby Pago Pago due to a possible cholera outbreak on board. Among the passengers are Alfred Davidson, a self-righteous missionary, his wife, and Sadie Thompson, a prostitute. Thompson passes the time partying and drinking with the American Marines stationed on the island. Sergeant Tim O'Hara, nicknamed by Sadie as "Handsome", falls in love with her.

Her wild behavior soon becomes more than the Davidsons can stand and Mr. Davidson confronts Sadie, resolving to save her soul.  When she dismisses his offer, Davidson has the Governor order her deported to San Francisco, California, where she is wanted for an unspecified crime (for which she says she was framed). She begs Davidson to allow her to remain on the island a few more days – her plan is to flee to Sydney, Australia. During a heated argument with Davidson, she experiences a religious conversion and agrees to return to San Francisco and the jail sentence awaiting her there.

The evening before she is to leave, Sergeant O'Hara asks Sadie to marry him and offers to hide her until the Sydney boat sails, but she refuses. Later, while native drums beat at an uninhibited native dance, the repressed Davidson checks on Sadie and is overcome by lust for her. The next morning he is found dead on the beach – a suicide. Davidson's hypocrisy and weakness allows Thompson to return to her old self and she goes off to Sydney with O'Hara to start a new life.

Cast

 Joan Crawford as Sadie Thompson
 Fred Howard as Hodgson
 Ben Hendricks Jr. as Griggs
 William Gargan as Sergeant Tim O'Hara
 Mary Shaw as Ameena
 Guy Kibbee as Joe Horn
 Kendall Lee as Mrs MacPhail
 Beulah Bondi as Mrs Davidson
 Matt Moore as Dr Robert MacPhail
 Walter Huston as Alfred Davidson
 Walter Catlett as Master Bates

Copyright status
In 1960, the film entered the public domain in the United States because the claimants did not renew its copyright registration in the 28th year after publication.

Reception

Rain was not well received – either critically or financially – upon initial release. The unglamorous role for Crawford, and bold story (religious hypocrisy being its main theme), caught Depression-era audiences off guard.

Motion Picture Herald commented,Because the producers have made such a strong attempt to establish the stern impressiveness of the story, it is rather slow. In its drive to become powerful, it appears to have lost the spark of spontaneity. ... Joan Crawford and Walter Huston are satisfactory.

Variety noted,It turns out to be a mistake to have assigned the Sadie Thompson role to Miss Crawford. It shows her off unfavorably. The dramatic significance of it all is beyond her range. ... [Director] Milestone tried to achieve action with the camera, but wears the witnesses down with words. Joan Crawford's get-up as the light lady is extremely bizarre. Pavement pounders don't quite trick themselves up as fantastically as all that. In commercial favor of Rain is the general repute of the theme and Miss Crawford's personal following, but the finished product will not help either.

Box office
The film earned $538,000 in the United States and Canada and $166,000 elsewhere, resulting in a loss of $198,000.

References

External links

 
 
 
 
 
 

1932 films
1932 drama films
American drama films
American black-and-white films
American films based on plays
1930s English-language films
Films based on works by W. Somerset Maugham
Films directed by Lewis Milestone
Films scored by Alfred Newman
Films set in American Samoa
Films shot in California
United Artists films
Articles containing video clips
1930s American films